The Isanti Outlaws are a junior ice hockey team based in Isanti, Minnesota. They compete in the United States Premier Hockey League (USPHL) Premier Division. The team plays its home games at Isanti Ice Arena.

History 
Formed in the summer of 2018, the Rum River Mallards joined the United States Premier Hockey League (USPHL) Premier Division as a member of the Midwest-West Division. The team was initially led by team president Glen Lucken and Brad Zangs as its first head coach and general manager. A group of investors, including Zangs, purchased the Ironwood Fighting Yoopers who were established in 2014 competing in the Minnesota Junior Hockey League (MnJHL) one season before joining the USPHL from 2016 to 2018.

Rum River earned their first victory on September 28, 2018, defeating the host Hudson Havoc 6–4. After 17 games played, the team was sold to local businessman Eddy Wilkinson who hired new head coach, Jimmy Jensen.

The Mallards' inaugural season ended with 51 points, one point back of the Minnesota Blue Ox, despite two regular season games being cancelled. Unable to reschedule those games before the playoffs, the Blue Ox hosted the best-of-three series as the higher seed. The Mallards defeated the Blue Ox in the second game 11–6 before being eliminated the following night.

After a good start to their second season, Jimmy Jensen stepped away from the bench for family reasons. He was replaced in early December by Triston Jensen, a former goaltender who played in both the MnJHL and USPHL. Triston played collegiate hockey at the ACHA level with Saginaw Valley State University. Rum River ended the 2019–20 season as the fifth seed with another playoff matchup against the Blue Ox. After winning the first game, the Minnesota Blue Ox responded by winning the final two games to advance in the division playoffs.

After four seasons as the Mallards team owner Jason Porter announced a new identity, Isanti Outlaws, in April 2022.

Season-by-season 

|}

References

External links 
Rum River Mallards website
USPHL website

Sports in Minneapolis–Saint Paul
Ice hockey teams in Minnesota
Ice hockey clubs established in 2018
2018 establishments in Minnesota
Isanti County, Minnesota